Vina Fay Wray (September 15, 1907 – August 8, 2004) was a Canadian-American actress best known for starring as Ann Darrow in the 1933 film King Kong. Through an acting career that spanned nearly six decades, Wray attained international recognition as an actress in horror films. She has been dubbed one of the early "scream queens".

After appearing in minor film roles, Wray gained media attention after being selected as one of the "WAMPAS Baby Stars" in 1926. This led to her being contracted to Paramount Pictures as a teenager, where she made more than a dozen feature films. After leaving Paramount, she signed deals with various film companies, being cast in her first horror film roles, in addition to many other types of roles, including in The Bowery (1933) and Viva Villa (1934), both of which starred Wallace Beery. For RKO Radio Pictures, Inc., Wray starred in the film she is most identified with, King Kong (1933). After the success of King Kong, she made numerous appearances in both film and television, retiring in 1980.

Life and career

Early life

 Wray was born on a ranch near Cardston, Alberta, to parents who were members of the Church of Jesus Christ of Latter-day Saints, Elvina Marguerite Jones, who was from Salt Lake City, Utah, and Joseph Heber Wray, who was from Kingston upon Hull, England. She was one of six children and was a granddaughter of LDS pioneer Daniel Webster Jones. Her ancestors came from England, Scotland, Ireland and Wales. Wray was never baptized a member of The Church of Jesus Christ of Latter-day Saints.

Her family returned to the United States a few years after she was born; they moved to Salt Lake City in 1912 and moved to Lark, Utah, in 1914. In 1919, the Wray family returned to Salt Lake City, and then relocated to Hollywood, where Fay attended Hollywood High School.

Early acting career

In 1923, Wray appeared in her first film at the age of 16, when she landed a role in a short historical film sponsored by a local newspaper. In the 1920s, Wray landed a major role in the silent film The Coast Patrol (1925), as well as uncredited bit parts at the Hal Roach Studios.

In 1926, the Western Association of Motion Picture Advertisers selected Wray as one of the "WAMPAS Baby Stars", a group of women whom they believed to be on the threshold of movie stardom. She was at the time under contract to Universal Studios, mostly co-starring in low-budget Westerns opposite Buck Jones.

The following year, Wray was signed to a contract with Paramount Pictures. In 1926, director Erich von Stroheim cast her as the main female lead in his film The Wedding March, released by Paramount two years later. While the film was noted for its high budget and production values, it was a financial failure.  It also gave Wray her first lead role. Wray stayed with Paramount to make more than a dozen films and made the transition from silent films to "talkies".

Horror films and King Kong

After leaving Paramount, Wray signed with other film studios. Under these deals, Wray was cast in several horror films, including Doctor X (1932) and Mystery of the Wax Museum (1933). However, her best known films were produced under her deal with RKO Radio Pictures. Her first film with RKO was The Most Dangerous Game (1932), co-starring Joel McCrea. The production was filmed at night on the same jungle sets that were being used for King Kong during the day, and with Wray and Robert Armstrong starring in both movies.

The Most Dangerous Game was followed by the release of Wray's best remembered film, King Kong. According to Wray, Jean Harlow had been RKO's original choice, but because MGM put Harlow under exclusive contract during the pre-production phase of the film, she became unavailable. Wray was approached by director Merian C. Cooper to play the blonde captive of King Kong; the role of Ann Darrow for which she was paid $10,000 ($ in  dollars) to portray. The film was a commercial success and Wray was reportedly proud that the film saved RKO from bankruptcy.

Later career

Wray continued to star in films, including The Richest Girl in the World, but by the early 1940s, her appearances became less frequent. She retired in 1942 after her second marriage but due to financial exigencies she soon resumed her acting career, and over the next three decades, Wray appeared in several films and appeared frequently on television. Wray portrayed Catherine Morrison in the 1953–54 sitcom The Pride of the Family  with Natalie Wood playing her daughter. Wray appeared in Queen Bee, released in 1955.

Wray appeared in three episodes of Perry Mason: "The Case of the Prodigal Parent" (1958); "The Case of the Watery Witness" (1959), as murder victim Lorna Thomas; and "The Case of the Fatal Fetish" (1965), as voodoo practitioner Mignon Germaine. In 1959, Wray was cast as Tula Marsh in the episode "The Second Happiest Day" of Playhouse 90. Other roles around this time were in the episodes "Dip in the Pool" (1958) and "The Morning After" of CBS's Alfred Hitchcock Presents. In 1960, she appeared as Clara in an episode of 77 Sunset Strip, "Who Killed Cock Robin?"  Another 1960 role was that of Mrs. Staunton, with Gigi Perreau as her daughter, in the episode "Flight from Terror" of The Islanders.

Wray appeared in a 1961 episode of The Real McCoys titled "Theatre in the Barn". In 1963, she played Mrs. Brubaker in The Eleventh Hour episode "You're So Smart, Why Can't You Be Good?". She ended her acting career with the 1980 made-for-television film Gideon's Trumpet.

In 1988, she published her autobiography On the Other Hand. In her later years, Wray continued to make public appearances. In 1991, she was crowned Queen of the Beaux Arts Ball, presiding with King Herbert Huncke.

She was approached by James Cameron to play the part of Rose Dawson Calvert for his blockbuster Titanic (1997) with Kate Winslet to play her younger self, but she turned down the role, which was subsequently portrayed by Gloria Stuart in an Oscar-nominated performance. She was a special guest at the 70th Academy Awards, where the show's host Billy Crystal introduced her as the "Beauty who charmed the Beast." She was the only 1920s Hollywood actress in attendance that evening. On October 3, 1998, she appeared at the Pine Bluff Film Festival, which showed The Wedding March with live orchestral accompaniment.

In January 2003, the 95-year-old Wray appeared at the 2003 Palm Beach International Film Festival to celebrate the Rick McKay documentary film Broadway: The Golden Age, by the Legends Who Were There, where she was honored with a "Legend in Film" award. In her later years, she visited the Empire State Building frequently; in 1991, she was a guest of honor at the building's 60th anniversary, and in May 2004, she made one of her last public appearances at the ESB. Her final public appearance was at the premiere of the documentary film Broadway: The Golden Age, by the Legends Who Were There in June 2004.

Personal life
Wray married three times – to writers John Monk Saunders and Robert Riskin and the neurosurgeon Sanford Rothenberg (January 28, 1919 – January 4, 1991).  She had three children: Susan Saunders, Victoria Riskin, and Robert Riskin Jr.

After returning to the US after finishing The Clairvoyant she became a naturalized citizen of the United States in May 1935.

Death

Wray died in her sleep of natural causes in the night of August 8, 2004, in her apartment on Fifth Avenue Manhattan. She is interred at the Hollywood Forever Cemetery in Hollywood, California.

Two days after her death, the lights of the Empire State Building were lowered for 15 minutes in her memory.

Honors

In 1989, Wray was awarded the Women in Film Crystal Award. Wray was honored with a Legend in Film award at the 2003 Palm Beach International Film Festival. For her contribution to the motion picture industry, Wray was honored with a star on the Hollywood Walk of Fame at 6349 Hollywood Blvd. She received a star posthumously on Canada's Walk of Fame in Toronto on June 5, 2005. A small park near Lee's Creek on Main Street in Cardston, Alberta, her birthplace, was named Fay Wray Park in her honor. The small sign at the edge of the park on Main Street has a silhouette of King Kong on it, remembering her role in King Kong. A large oil portrait of Wray by Alberta artist Neil Boyle is on display in the Empress Theatre in Fort Macleod, Alberta. In May 2006, Wray became one of the first four entertainers to be honored by Canada Post by being featured on a postage stamp.

Partial filmography

Gasoline Love (1923 short subject)
Just A Good Guy (1924) as Girl Getting Into Car 
The Coast Patrol (1925) as Beth Slocum
Sure-Mike (1925 short) as Salesgirl at Department Store
What Price Goofy (1925 short) as Concerned Girl with Perfume (uncredited)
Isn't Life Terrible? (1925 short) as Potential Pen-Buyer (uncredited)
Thundering Landlords (1925 short) as The Wife
Chasing the Chaser (1925 short) as Nursemaid
Madame Sans Jane (1925 short)
No Father to Guide Him (1925 short) as Beach House Cashier (uncredited)
Unfriendly Enemies (1925 short) as The Girl
Your Own Back Yard (1925 short) as Woman in Quarrelsome Couple
A Lover's Oath (1925) (uncredited) *lost film
Moonlight and Noses (1925 short) as Miss Sniff, the Professor's Daughter
Should Sailors Marry? (1925 short) as Herself
Ben-Hur: A Tale of the Christ (1925) as Slave Girl (unconfirmed, uncredited)
WAMPAS Baby Stars of 1926 (1926 short) as Herself
One Wild Time (1926 short)
Don Key (A Son of a Burro) (1926 short)
The Man in the Saddle (1926) as Pauline Stewart *lost film
Don't Shoot (1926 short) as Nancy Burton
The Wild Horse Stampede (1926) as Jessie Hayden
The Saddle Tramp (1926 short)
The Show Cowpuncher (1926 short)
Lazy Lightning (1926) as Lila Rogers
Loco Luck (1927) as Molly Vernon
A One Man Game (1927) as Roberta
Spurs and Saddles (1927) as Mildred Orth
A Trip Through the Paramount Studio (1927 short) as Herself
The Legion of the Condemned (1928) as Christine Charteris *lost film
Street of Sin (1928) as Elizabeth *lost film
The First Kiss (1928) as Anna Lee *lost film
The Wedding March (1928) as Mitzi / Mitzerl Schrammell
The Four Feathers (1929) as Ethne Eustace
Thunderbolt (1929) as Ritzie
Pointed Heels (1929) as Lora Nixon
Behind the Make-Up (1930) as Marie Gardoni
Paramount on Parade (1930) as Sweetheart (Dream Girl)
The Texan (1930) as Consuelo
The Border Legion (1930) as Joan Randall
The Sea God (1930) as Daisy
The Honeymoon (1930, unreleased) as Mitzi
Captain Thunder (1930) as Ynez
Stub Man (1931)
The Slippery Pearls (1931 short) as Herself
Dirigible (1931) as Helen Pierce
The Conquering Horde (1931) as Taisie Lockhart
Not Exactly Gentlemen (1931) as Lee Carleton
The Finger Points (1931) as Marcia Collins
The Lawyer's Secret (1931) as Kay Roberts
The Unholy Garden (1931) as Camille de Jonghe
Hollywood on Parade (1932 short subject) as Herself
Stowaway (1932) as Mary Foster
Doctor X (1932) as Joanne Xavier
The Most Dangerous Game (1932) as Eve Trowbridge
The Vampire Bat (1933) as Ruth Bertin
Mystery of the Wax Museum (1933) as Charlotte Duncan
King Kong (1933) as Ann Darrow
Below the Sea (1933) as Diana
Ann Carver's Profession (1933) as Ann Carver Graham
The Woman I Stole (1933) as Vida Carew
Shanghai Madness (1933) as Wildeth Christie
The Big Brain (1933) as Cynthia Glennon
One Sunday Afternoon (1933) as Virginia Brush
The Bowery (1933) as Lucy Calhoun
 Master of Men (1933) as Kay Walling
Madame Spy (1934) as Marie Franck
The Countess of Monte Cristo (1934) as Janet Krueger
Once to Every Woman (1934) as Mary Fanshane
Viva Villa! (1934) as Teresa
Black Moon (1934) as Gail Hamilton
The Affairs of Cellini (1934) as Angela
The Richest Girl in the World (1934) as Sylvia Lockwood
Cheating Cheaters (1934) as Nan Brockton
Woman in the Dark (1934) as Louise Loring
Mills of the Gods (1934) as Jean Hastings
The Clairvoyant (1935) (US title: The Evil Mind) as Rene
Bulldog Jack (1935) as Ann Manders
Come Out of the Pantry (1935) as Hilda Beach-Howard
White Lies (1935) as Joan Mitchell
When Knights Were Bold (1936) as Lady Rowena
Roaming Lady (1936) as Joyce Reid
They Met in a Taxi (1936) as Mary Trenton
It Happened in Hollywood (1937) as Gloria Gay
Murder in Greenwich Village (1937) as Kay Cabot aka Lucky
The Jury's Secret (1938) as Linda Ware
Smashing the Spy Ring (1938) as Eleanor Dunlap
Navy Secrets (1939) as Carol Mathews – Posing as Carol Evans
Wildcat Bus (1940) as Ted Dawson
Adam Had Four Sons (1941) as Molly Stoddard
Melody for Three (1941) as Mary Stanley
Not a Ladies' Man (1942) as Hester Hunter
This Is the Life (1944, co-author of play with Sinclair Lewis) 
Treasure of the Golden Condor (1953) as Annette, Marquise de St. Malo
Small Town Girl (1953) as Mrs. Kimbell
The Cobweb (1955) as Edna Devanal
Queen Bee (1955) as Sue McKinnon
Hell on Frisco Bay (1956) as Kay Stanley
Rock, Pretty Baby (1956) as Beth Daley
Crime of Passion (1957) as Alice Pope
Tammy and the Bachelor (1957) as Mrs. Brent
Summer Love (1958) as Beth Daley
Dragstrip Riot (1958) as Norma Martin / Mrs. Martin
Wagon Train (1962) as Mrs. Edward's, The Cole Crawford Story
Gideon's Trumpet (1980) as Edna Curtis
Off the Menu: The Last Days of Chasen's (1997 documentary) as Herself
Broadway: The Golden Age, by the Legends Who Were There (2003 documentary) as Herself

Cultural references

In The Rocky Horror Picture Show, Fay Wray is referenced by name in two songs. At the beginning of the movie, "Science Fiction/Double Feature" contains "Then something went wrong / For Fay Wray and King Kong / They got caught in a celluloid jam", and  near the end extraterrestrial transvestite mad scientist Frank N. Furter sings in the song, "Don't Dream It": "Whatever happened to Fay Wray? / That delicate satin-draped frame / As it clung to her thigh / How I started to cry / 'Cause I wanted to be dressed just the same".
Mentioned in the chorus of the Jimmy Ray song, "Are You Jimmy Ray?"
Type O Negative, on their album Bloody Kisses, has a track titled "Fay Wray Come Out to Play."
Mentioned repeatedly in Thomas Pynchon's Gravity's Rainbow.
 Fay Wray is briefly mentioned in the Bruce Cockburn song "Mama Just Wants to Barrelhouse All Night Long" on the 1973 Night Vision album in its second verse: "I hear the city singing like a siren choir / Some fool tried to set this town on fire / TV preacher screams 'come on along' / I feel like Fay Wray face to face with King Kong / But Mama just wants to barrelhouse all night long."
 Fay Wray has been mentioned in the Peanuts comic strip a couple of times, mostly involving characters Snoopy and Woodstock in reenacting the iconic scenes from King Kong. The first one was in a September 11, 1976 strip with Snoopy playing as King Kong while holding Woodstock as Ann Darrow (with a brief mention of her co-star Bruce Cabot); and in an August 29, 1976 Sunday strip format where Snoopy is dreaming that his nose is the Empire State Building and Woodstock, as King Kong, is climbing atop of it in real time. Waking up from it, Snoopy complains afterwards that "Fay Wray didn't even show up" in it.

See also

 Canadian pioneers in early Hollywood

References

External links

 
 
 
 
 Fay Wray at Northern Stars website
 Fay Wray speaking at UCLA 11/18/1970

1907 births
2004 deaths
20th-century American actresses
20th-century American memoirists
20th-century Canadian actresses
Actresses from Alberta
Actresses from Los Angeles
Actresses from New York City
American film actresses
American people of Canadian descent
American people of English descent
American people of Irish descent
American people of Scottish descent
American people of Welsh descent
American silent film actresses
American television actresses
American women memoirists
Burials at Hollywood Forever Cemetery
Canadian child actresses
Canadian emigrants to the United States
Canadian film actresses
Canadian people of American descent
Canadian people of English descent
Canadian people of Irish descent
Canadian people of Scottish descent
Canadian people of Welsh descent
Hollywood High School alumni
Naturalized citizens of the United States
Paramount Pictures contract players
People from Cardston
RKO Pictures contract players
WAMPAS Baby Stars
Western (genre) film actresses
21st-century American women